The Mercedes-Benz first series of automatic transmission was produced from 1961 to 1983 in four- and three-speed variants for Mercedes-Benz passenger cars. In addition, variants for commercial vehicles were offered.

Abstract
The Mercedes-Benz first series of automatic transmission started off in 1961 with the K4A 025 (Kupplungs-4-Gang-Automatik bis 25 kpm Eingangsdrehmoment; clutch-4-gear-automatic with 181 ft·lb maximum input torque; without type designation) and was followed up by a family with a more reliable design. This started in 1964 with the K4B 050 (without type designation) and ended up in the K4C 025 and K4A 040 (type 722.2) as the four-speed automatic transmissions.

Later, when the torque converter technique was fully established, the W3A 040 and W3B 050 (type 722.0) were launched as three-speed derivates for V8 engines. At the same time the fluid coupling for the smaller engines was replaced by a torque converter as well, which leads to the W4A 025 (type 722.1).

Beside this the version W4A 018 (type 720.1) for vans and off road vehicles, and the W4A 035 for light trucks were derived.

Specifications

Introduction
This transmission was the first Mercedes-Benz automatic transmission in house developing. Before this, the company used semi-automatic systems like a vacuum-powered shifting for overdrive or the "Hydrak" hydraulic automatic clutch system. Alternatively, they bought automatic transmissions of other vendors, such as BorgWarner.

The automatic transmissions are for engines with longitudinal layout for rear-wheel-drive layout passenger cars. The control of the fully automatic system is fully hydraulic and it uses electrical wire only for the kickdown solenoid valve and the neutral safety switch. Three-speed units use two planetary gearsets and 4-speed units use three planetary gearsets.

Physically, it can be recognized for its pan which uses sixteen bolts.

Basic concept
For the 4-speed models 8 main components are used. The 3-speed-models uses 7 main components, which shows economic equivalence with the direct competitor.

Gear ratios

Models

K4A 025
The K4A 025 (without type designation) is the first of the series, launched in April 1961 for the W111 220SEB, later replaced with the K4C 025 (type 722.2). It is a 4-speed unit and uses fluid coupling (also referred in some manuals as hydraulic/automatic clutch). It is the only exemption which uses only two planetary gearsets for four speeds.

K4B 050
The layout of the K4A 025 turned out as not very reliable. The Mercedes-Benz 600 from 1964, the first post-war "Grand Mercedes", is powered by the Mercedes-Benz M100 engine. The automatic transmission was replaced by a three planetary gearset design to handle the much higher torque of the big block V8 engine and to meet the much higher standards of luxury vehicles.

K4C 025 and K4A 040
The K4C 025 (type 722.2) was the core model of the first automatic transmission series from Mercedes-Benz. The layout is based on the K4B 050, which turned out as much more reliable as the previous layout from the K4A 025. With the small block V8 engine M 116 the K4A 040 (type 722.2) as a stronger version of the same design was launched.

W3A 040 and W3B 050
As a three-speed unit, the W3A 040 and W3B 050 (type 722.0) is combined with V8 engines, and it uses torque converter instead of fluid coupling. The transmission saves one planetary gearset and uses the same housing as the four-speed versions. The free space therefore is used to reinforce the shift elements (brakes and clutches) to handle the higher torque of the V8 engines.

First the W3A 040 was released for the all new M117 V8 engine of the Mercedes-Benz W108 and W109 in 1971. The second in the series is the W3B 050, which was released initially for the W116 450 SE and SEL in 1973. At that time the four-speed transmission for the 350 SE and SEL was replaced by this three-speed model. The reinforced W3B 050 reinforced (type 722.003) is the strongest of the series, able to handle the input of the enlarged version of the Mercedes-Benz M100 engine, the biggest Mercedes-Benz engine in post-war history, exclusively used in the W116 450 SEL 6.9.

W4B 025
The W4B 025 (type 722.1) is the K4C 025, where the fluid-coupling is replaced by a torque converter. Used in L4, L5 and L6 engines due to its lower torque output. For V8-engines see W3A 040 and W3B 050 (type 722.0) above.

In normal situations, it rests stationary in 2nd gear, but it will use 1st gear when the vehicle starts moving and throttle is applied or if L position is selected in gear selector.

W4A 018 and W4B 035
The W4A 018 (type 720.1) was derived from the W4B 025 (type 722.1) for vans up to 5.600 kg (12,345 pounds) and off road vehicles, the W4B 035 from the W4B 025 (type 722.1) and K4A 040 (type 722.2) for light trucks up to 13.000 kg (28,660 pounds). The main difference is the use of straight toothed planetary gearsets instead of helical toothed ones for better fuel efficiency at the price of lower noise comfort.

Applications

K4C 025

K4A 040

W3A 040

W3B 050

W4B 025

See also

List of Daimler AG transmissions

Notes

References 

1